West Craven High School is a mixed 11 to 16 comprehensive school in Barnoldswick, Lancashire, England.

School history

Funding to update the school's buildings had been agreed as part of the Building Schools for the Future project, but was cancelled in 2010. £6 million was later spent on the buildings.

The school became an academy in 2016, as part of the Pendle Education Trust.

Ofsted judgements

As of 2020, the school's most recent Ofsted inspection was in 2019, with a judgement of Inadequate.

Notable former pupils

 Glen Chapple, Lancashire and England cricketer
 John Rawnsley – opera singer and actor

References

Schools in the Borough of Pendle
Secondary schools in Lancashire
Barnoldswick
Academies in Lancashire